The Business is an independent record store, music distribution company and concert venue located on Commercial Avenue in Anacortes, Skagit County, Washington, United States. It formerly also housed a book store, a photography studio, a café-bistro, a recording studio and a record label. From 1978 to 2008, The Business was located at 1717 Commercial Avenue; from 2008 to 2016 at 402 Commercial Avenue; and since 2016 it has been located at 216 Commercial Avenue.

The store currently stocks new and used music releases on vinyl records, compact discs and audio cassettes, as well as music-oriented posters and original artworks. It also frequently holds free, all-ages shows during store hours with locally and nationally known artists from a wide variety of genres.

History and owners

1717 Commercial Avenue 
Founded by Glen Des Jardins in 1978, The Business opened at 1717 Commercial Avenue in Anacortes, Washington. It was not a record store but actually a used book shop and photography studio where shoppers could even purchase bird seeds, stained glass and photography equipment.

In 1988, local musician Bret Lunsford began working at The Business, part-time in between his band Beat Happening's tours. By 1990, he had bought a share as a partner and in 1993, when Beat Happening broke up, he became a full-time employee. Lunsford was responsible for starting to stock music releases in the store. By 1998 he had become sole owner of the company, though the building itself was co-owned with his wife Denise Crowe. Des Jardins went on to operate the Pacific Rim Used Books webstore.

Under Lunsford's ownership, The Business (legally registered as The Business, A Retail Experiment, Incorporated) narrowed its focus to music and became principally known as a record store, stocking new and used vinyl records, compact discs and audio cassettes. But it also continued to sale a number of other items including used books, movies on VHS and laserdisc, video games, turntables, cameras, magazines, postcards and other vintage collectibles and ephemera. Lunsford also started hosting local concerts at The Business, founded his own record label Knw-Yr-Own Records, built a small recording studio out of the back room, and even opened a café-bistro, Café Desjardins, named after the store's original owner.

Lunsford befriended other local musicians Karl Blau and Phil Elverum, who became involved in The Business. Their bands The Microphones and D+ recorded their early releases at The Business' back room studio. In 2001, Drea Killingsworth and Nicole Holbert, two The Business employees, revamped the bistro into Café Adrift. Café Adrift eventually became its own restaurant at 510 Commercial Avenue.

Lunsford sold The Business in April 2005 to husband-and-wife team Liz Lovelett and Jensen Lovelett. Under the Loveletts' ownership, the store maintained the same scope: mainly selling music but also a great deal of antiques and collectibles and even clothing. Lunsford and Crowe put the 1717 Commercial Avenue building up for sale in September 2008, asking $420,000 USD, which forced the Loveletts to seek out a new location for The Business.

402 Commercial Avenue 
The Business officially re-opened its doors at its second location on October 3, 2008. Located at 402 Commercial Avenue in the John M. Platt Building, the historic brick structure had originally been built in 1890 for the Bank of Anacortes. The Business took over the lease from the former The Red Snapper gift shop. By this time, the Loveletts had already stopped hosting concerts and focused on selling vintage and antique goods instead of music.

On May 1, 2010, The Business' ownership changed hands to Menomonee Falls, Wisconsin-native musician Nick Rennis. The Loveletts have since gone on to operate the antique shop Alley Cat Antiques and since 2019, Liz Lovelett has been in politics in the office of the Washington State Senate, District 40. Rennis had been living in Chicago, Illinois up until July 2009, when he moved to Anacortes and became a partner in concert venue and recording studio Department of Safety. Department of Safety closed down in February 2010 and Rennis was looking for a new music-related business venture to operate. Through connections with Phil Elverum and Karl Blau (both formerly owners of Department of Safety and prior employees of The Business), Rennis was introduced to the record store. Under Rennis' ownership, The Business returned its focus to the music industry, making it an actual record store. Rennis also re-established the free all-ages in-store concerts.

In late 2011, Rennis met Evie Opp, another Illinois-native, a business major living in Anacortes. The two started dating and Opp started working at The Business. They eventually married and she became co-owner of The Business. In November 2011, Rennis and Opp started a music distribution arm at The Business, unofficially referred to as The Business Distribution or The Business Distro-.

216 Commercial Avenue 
On March 1, 2016, The Business opened its doors at its third location, only a block and a half north from its second, at 216 Commercial Avenue in the Alfred Olson Building. Built in 1902 the Alfred Olson Building is part of the National Register of Historic Places and had formerly been home to streaming radio station Anacortes Music Channel, and prior to that of art gallery Anchor Arts Space. The move had been announced as early as November 2015 and was stated to be the result of problems with neighboring stores.

On April 11, 2018, The Business was voted Best Record Store in Washington State by webzine Vinyl Me, Please. The webzine editors, Amileah Sutliff and Andrew Winistorfer, later included The Business in their coffee table book The Best Record Stores in the United States, containing a foreword by Mark Farina and published in 2019 for Record Store Day.

On July 29, 2020, The Business announced a direct partnership with The Criterion Collection, allowing The Business to sell The Criterion Collection's DVD and Blu-ray releases in their retail store.

The Business distribution 
The Business' distribution outfit, unofficially referred to as The Business Distribution or The Business Distro-, was started in November 2011 by Nick Rennis and Evie Opp. It handles global direct-retail and wholesale distribution for a vast roster of independent record labels. It also offers mail-order fulfillment for local independent bands. As of December 2020, The Business officially distributes 70 record labels. Some of its business partners include BlueSanct Records, Dais Records, Gnar Tapes, Graveface Records, HoZac Records, K Records, Marriage Records, Oaken Palace Records, People in a Position to Know Recordings, Somewherecold Records, States Rights Records and Knw-Yr-Own Records.

History 
The initial five record labels that The Business' distribution outfit began with, in November 2011, were K Records, Knw-Yr-Own Records, Marriage Records, Modern Documents and P.W. Elverum & Sun, Ltd. Most of these record labels already had an established consignment deal with the record store, and prior to that with the Department of Safety. In July 2012, three additional record labels were added to the roster: Off Tempo Records, States Rights Records and Wil-Ru Records. Up until this point, all of the record labels with distribution deals at The Business were based in the Pacific Northwest, principally in Washington and Oregon; The Business had not anticipated to grow beyond this area. Gnome Life Records and Porchlight Records joined in November 2012; Gnome Life Records, based in California, was the first non-Pacific Northwest record label to sign a distribution deal with The Business. The only record label to join in 2013 was Resurrection Records, in April.

2014 saw four record labels sign distribution deals with The Business: Orindal Records in January; People in a Position to Know Recordings in May; Untide Records in October; and Keeled Scales in November. Orindal Records, based in Chicago, Illinois, was The Business' first Midwest record label to sign a distribution deal, while Keeled Scales, based in Austin, Texas, was its first Southern record label. Jaz Records, the first Canadian record label to sign a distribution deal with The Business, joined the team in January 2015, while Gnar Tapes (from California) came on board in February after buying out the already-distributed Marriage Records. 7 e.p., based in Tokyo, Japan, was the first international record label to sign with The Business in July 2015.

2016 greatly expanded The Business' distribution roster with the addition of eleven more record labels: Lost Sound Tapes and Rumbletowne Records, both in April; Cosmic Dreamer Music and Trans- Records in May; Orange Milk Records in September; Dais Records and Tall Pat Records, both in October; Life Like in November; HoZac Records in December; as well as Curly Cassettes and Three:Four Records. Orange Milk Records, based in Brooklyn, New York, was the first Eastern record label to sign a distribution deal with The Business, while Three:Four Records, based in Switzerland, was the first European record label to join the distribution team.

2017 was by far the most prolific year for The Business' distribution division, welcoming fifteen new record labels to the company. This included Guruguru Brain Records in January; Avant! Records, Yerevan Tapes, Dub Ditch Picnic, Sundowning Sound Recordings and La Castanya, all in February; Maple Death Records and Tenth Court Records in March; Hands in the Dark Records in July; Oaken Palace Records in September; Shinkoyo in October; Debacle Records, Moone Records and New Atlantis Records, all in November; and Bruit Direct Disques in December. Five record labels were added throughout 2018: Sophomore Lounge in February; Whited Sepulchre Records in May; Sheep Chase Records in June; Artemisia Records in July; and The Helen Scarsdale Agency in September.

2019 was another highlight year for The Business, recruiting eleven record companies, including BlueSanct Records, Full Spectrum Records, Sleeping Giant Glossolalia and Textile Records, all in January; Drop Medium and SIGE Records (a Hydra Head Records subsidiary) in February; IFB Records and Sound of Cobra Records in March; Slowboy Records in August; Entr’acte in October; and Alien Snatch! Records in December. In 2020, distribution deals were made with ten record labels: Oscarson in January; Somewherecold Records in March; Inner Islands in July; Zum Audio in August; Geertruida in September; Idée Fixe Records in October; and ZamZamRec in November; as well as Chicago Research, Graveface Records and Dear Life Records.

Concert venue 
Since Lundsford's ownership in the mid 1990s, The Business has been home to local and touring performing artists. From 2008 to 2010, under the Loveletts' ownership, concerts were put on hold while they raised their family. When Rennis took over The Business, the record store resumed hosting concerts and all shows became free and open to all ages. Some of the bands that have performed at The Business over the years include Braid, Rainer Maria, Superdrag, D+, The Microphones, Karl Blau, Your Heart Breaks, Rose Melberg, The Finches, Ryley Walker, Daniel Bachman, Bonnie "Prince" Billy, Dave McGraw & Mandy Fer, Mount Eerie, The Evaporators, Bent Knee, Teen Daze, Ralph White, The Shivers, Mamiffer, Jon Mueller, Frankie Cosmos, Lori Goldston and Kimya Dawson.

References

Further reading

External links 
 
 
 
 
 
 

1978 establishments in Washington (state)
American companies established in 1978
Buildings and structures in Washington (state)
Companies based in Anacortes, Washington
Entertainment companies of the United States
Independent stores
Music retailers of the United States
Music venues in Washington (state)
Record label distributors
Retail companies established in 1978